Bindiya may refer to:
 Bindi (decoration)
 Bindiya (film), a 1960 Indian Hindi-language drama film
 Bindiya (Pakistani actress)
 Bindiya (Bangladeshi actress)
 Bindiya (novel),  a 1956 novel by Ramnath Pandey